Andrew or Andy Love may refer to:

 Andrew Love (baseball) (1907–1986), American baseball player
 Andrew Love (musician) (1941–2012), American saxophone player
 Andy Love (jazz vocalist) (né Andrew Jackson Love; 1911–1982), jazz vocalist with the Tune Twisters
 Andy Love (singer) (active 1998–2000), British singer (Northern Line)
 Andrew C. Love (1894–1987), producer and director of radio theater for NBC national broadcasts
 Andy Love (fl. 1990s–2010s), British politician
 Andy Love (English footballer) (born 1979), English footballer
 Andy Love (Scottish footballer) (1905–1962), Scottish football winger